Enno may refer to:

People

Given name
Enno I, Count of Ostfriesland (1460–1491)
Enno II, Count of Ostfriesland (1505–1540)
Enno III, Count of Ostfriesland (1563–1625)
Enno Brandrøk (1538–1571), Norwegian noble- and highwayman (named after Enno II, Count of Ostfriesland)
Enno Lend (born 1957), Estonian economist and rector 
Enno Littmann (1875–1958), German orientalist
Enno Mõts (born 1974), Estonian military officer
Enno Ootsing (born 1940), Estonian artist and academic
Enno Patalas (1929–2018), German film historian
Enno Penno (1930–2016), Estonian politician
Enno Hagenah (born 1957), German politician
Enno Cheng (born 1987), Taiwanese Film actor, Singer-Songwriter and Author

Surname
Ernst Enno (1875–1934), Estonian poet and writer

Other
En'ō, Japanese era name after Ryakunin and before Ninji
Enno, Estonia, village in Nõo Parish, Tartu County, Estonia
Enno, brand of the Metronom Eisenbahngesellschaft

Estonian masculine given names
Estonian-language surnames